Nagarjun is a municipality in Kathmandu District in Bagmati Province of Nepal. It was formed on 2 December 2014 by merging the former VDCs of Bhimdhunga, Ichangu Narayan, Ramkot, Syuchatar and Sitapaila. The office of the municipality is located at Harisiddhi, Sitapaila. There are ten wards in the municipality.

Geography 
It is surrounded by 13,14, 15 and 16 number wards of Kathmandu Metropolitan City on the east, Dhading District on the west, Tarkeshwar Municipality on the north and Chandragiri Municipality on the south.

Population
Nagarjun municipality has a total population of 67,420 (34064 males and, 33356 females) according to 2011 Nepal census. Newar, Bahun, Magar, Sanyasi and Chhetri are the majority ethnic groups in this municipality, most of the population follow Hinduism and Buddhism.

Popular sites 

 Ichangu Narayan Temple
 Amitabha Monastery
 Aadeswor Mahadev Temple

 Halchowk Akash Bhairav
 Tarkeshwar Temple
 Badri Narayan Dham
 Sahid Park
 Switzerland Park
 Panch Kanya Temple
 Bhuwaneswori Temple

References

External links
Nagarjun

Populated places in Kathmandu District